The Early Start Denver Model (ESDM) is a form of therapy directed at young children that display early signs of being on the autism spectrum proposed by American psychiatrists Sally J. Rogers and Geraldine Dawson. It is intended to help children improve development traits as early as possible so as to narrow or close the gaps in capabilities between the individual and their peers.

Development 
The American psychiatrists Sally J. Rogers and Geraldine Dawson began developing the Early Start Denver Model during the 1980s. While working at the University of Colorado, in Denver, Rogers provided what was first called the "play school model" of intervention which was applied to children in preschool during their regular play activities. The model was founded in Piaget's theory of cognitive development and came to be described by Rogers and Dawson as the Denver Model.

In 2010, the two researchers published Early Start Denver Model for Young Children with Autism: Promoting Language, Learning, and Engagement, in which the ESDM is manualized and described in detail. It is generally cited to be directed towards children between 12 and 48 months of age, and is closely related to Applied behavior analysis, influencing and being influenced by this field of work.

Description 
The ESDM is aimed at using "joint activity routines" that explore the child's natural interests to explore their learning potential, shaping everyday activities between the child and their caregivers to maximize their development potential according to the child's assessment.

Rogers and Dawson describe the core features of the ESDM as:

 an interdisciplinary team that implements a developmental curriculum addressing all domains;
 focus on interpersonal engagement;
 development of fluent, reciprocal, and spontaneous imitation of gestures, facial movements and expressions, and object use;
 emphasis on both nonverbal and verbal communication development;
 focus on cognitive aspects of play carried out within dyadic play routines;
 partnership with parents.

Assessment 
The intervention begins with measuring the child's skill levels in language, social skills, imitation, cognition, play, and motor and self-help skills. The assessment serves as a baseline for future reassessments, which are rerun every 12 weeks, and a model of it is presented in Rogers and Dawson's 2010 book, being called the ESDM Curriculum Checklist.

Intervention plan 
Results from the first assessment are used to draw an intervention plan, which describes the activities to be performed with the child by the parents and therapists. An interdisciplinary team oversees the progress and readjusts the plan with every new 12-week assessment. The parents are also trained (or "coached") and play a role in the program, taking on some of the activities in the child's intervention plan or, in some cases, conducting it all together.

Among the domains focused on by the intervention plan are of particular importance: imitation, nonverbal communication (including joint attention), verbal communication, social development (including emotion sharing), and play.

Efficacy 
Several studies have been published in an effort to assess its efficacy in mitigating the developmental delays in young children diagnosed with autism. Research of this kind is inherently complex, since it involves comparing groups receiving different types of treatment and it is ethically questionable to set aside a control group that would receive no treatment; therefore it is challenging to perform the objective measurement of treatment effects.

Rogers and Dawson have performed different trials of their methods. They published, with 6 other authors, a randomized controlled trial in 2012 that younger age and longer hours of weekly intervention hours positively correlate with improvements in most variables measured by the method. They followed up with a study published in 2015 where they tried to gauge the method's long-term efficacy by examining children at 6 years of age, ,2 years after the ESDM had ended. By comparing one group that had received traditional methods of treatment with another group receiving the ESDM treatment starting at between 18 to 30 months of age, they found no significant differences between the groups in core autism symptoms immediately after treatment ended (at 4 years of age); the ESDM group did show, however, significant improvements in core autism symptoms after 2 years, implying that the benefits of the treatment at a younger age affect developmental traits that only become noticeable in later stages of development. This was the first study that analyzed the efficacy of ESDM treatment starting at an age younger than 30 months.

Meta-analyses and systematic reviews have shown that the ESDM is promising. A meta-analysis of 12 individual studies with a total of 640 children published in 2020 concluded that, compared to control groups receiving traditional forms of treatment, children receiving the ESDM showed significant improvements in cognition and language abilities (G-test numbers of 0.412 and 0.408, respectively). A separate meta-analysis using 11 studies described as high-quality randomized controlled trials analyzed results in four major domains related to ASD (autism symptoms, language, cognition, and social communication). The study found that children receiving the ESDM showed significant improvements in the cognition (g = 0.28), autism symptoms (g = 0.27), and language (g = 0.29) domains.

Usage in countries 
The diagnosis of autism has undergone significant changes in recent decades, which means the forms of treatment have also changed. Therefore, countries have incorporated treatment options in heterogeneous ways, meaning that the Denver Model has been adopted with different intensities throughout the world. The list below presents a brief description of how each country's healthcare system (public or private) deal with this form of treatment:

Australia 
The National Disability Insurance Scheme of the Australian government recognizes the ESDM as a form of "naturalistic developmental behavioural intervention" with enough scientific evidence to support it, and will cover the costs of treatment and parent-training sessions if the child is eligible for this type of treatment.

Brazil 
The Agência Nacional de Saúde Suplementar (ANS), Brazil's regulating body for private healthcare plan providers, recognizes different forms of ASD within the scope of pervasive developmental disorders. It lists ESDM as one of the forms of treatment that should be taken into consideration by healthcare providers for children with developmental disorders. Since July 1st, 2022, healthcare providers are obligated to provide the form of treatment prescribed by the child's doctor, and this includes the ESDM.

France 
Since 2012, the Haute Autorité de Santé of France recognizes ESDM's efficacy and recommends that public healthcare institutions consider it as one of their options when treating children with ESDM.

United States 
All 50 states in the USA have legislation requiring the coverage of autism spectrum treatments by private health insurance companies. The Centers for Disease Control and Prevention (CDC) includes the ESDM as a developmental approach in the treatment of ASD.

A study of applying the ESDM at an early age was conducted to assess the cost-effectiveness of applying the ESDM at an early age rather than using the traditional methods of treatment at later stages. The study indicates that the average increased cost of treatment at younger ages was significantly smaller than the total savings in treatments at older ages, with children needing fewer sessions of ABA/EIBI, occupational, physical and speech therapy services.

References 

Behavior analysis
Behavior
Behavior modification
Behavioral concepts
Treatment of autism